The 2016–17 Top 14 competition was the 118th French domestic rugby union club competition operated by the Ligue Nationale de Rugby (LNR). Two new teams from the 2015–16 Pro D2 season were promoted to Top 14 this year, Bayonne and Lyon in place of the two relegated teams, Agen and Oyonnax. It marked the first time that both promoted teams had returned on their first opportunity after relegation (Bayonne and Lyon were both relegated during the 2014–15 Top 14 season).

Teams

Number of teams by regions

Competition format
The top six teams at the end of the regular season (after all the teams played one another twice, once at home, once away) enter a knockout stage to decide the Champions of France.  This consists of three rounds: the teams finishing third to sixth in the table play quarter-finals (hosted by the third and fourth placed teams).  The winners then face the top two teams in the semi-finals, with the winners meeting in the final at the Stade de France in Saint-Denis.

The LNR uses a slightly different bonus points system from that used in most other rugby competitions. It trialled a new system in 2007–08 explicitly designed to prevent a losing team from earning more than one bonus point in a match, a system that also made it impossible for either team to earn a bonus point in a drawn match. LNR chose to continue with this system for subsequent seasons.

France's bonus point system operates as follows:

 4 points for a win.
 2 points for a draw.
 1 bonus point for winning while scoring at least 3 more tries than the opponent. This replaces the standard bonus point for scoring 4 tries regardless of the match result.
 1 bonus point for losing by 5 points (or fewer). The margin had been 7 points until being changed prior to the 2014–15 season.

Table

Relegation
Normally, the teams that finish in 13th and 14th places in the table are relegated to Pro D2 at the end of the season.  In certain circumstances, "financial reasons" may cause a higher placed team to be demoted instead. This last happened at the end of the 2009–10 season when 12th place Montauban were relegated thereby reprieving 13th place Bayonne.

Fixtures & Results

Round 1

Round 2

Round 3

Round 4

Round 5

Round 6

Round 7

Round 8

Round 9

Round 10

Round 11

Round 12

Round 13

Round 14

Round 15

Round 16

Postponed due to adverse weather conditions.  Game rescheduled for 12 February 2017.

Postponed due to Racing playing a European Rugby Champions Cup fixture against Munster.  The original fixture had been cancelled due to the death of Munster head coach Anthony Foley meaning the game was moved to a weekend.  Racing's game against Bayonne would be rescheduled for 11 February 2017.

Round 17

Round 16 rescheduled matches

Game rescheduled from 8 January 2017.

Game rescheduled from 8 January 2017.

Round 18

Round 19

Round 20

Round 21

Postponed due to player strikes and turmoil surrounding the announced merger between franciliens teams Stade Français and Racing 92.  Game would be rescheduled to 19 April 2017.

Postponed due to player strikes and turmoil surrounding the announced merger between franciliens teams Stade Français and Racing 92.  Game would be rescheduled to 22 April 2017.

Round 22

Round 23

Round 24

Round 21 rescheduled matches

Game rescheduled from 17 March 2017.

Game rescheduled from 18 March 2017.

Round 25

Round 26

Playoffs

Semi-final Qualifiers

Semi-finals

Final

Leading scorers
Note: Flags to the left of player names indicate national team as has been defined under World Rugby eligibility rules, or primary nationality for players who have not yet earned international senior caps. Players may hold one or more non-WR nationalities.

Top points scorers

Top try scorers

Attendances

 Attendances do not include the semi-finals or final as these are at neutral venues.

See also
2016–17 Rugby Pro D2 season

Notes

References

 
Top 14 seasons
 
France